Charles Garrett Holder (1874-1962) was a politician from Alberta, Canada. He served in the Legislative Assembly of Alberta from 1935 to 1940 and from 1944 to 1948 as a member of the Social Credit caucus.

Political career
Holder ran for a seat to the Alberta Legislature for the first time in the 1935 general election, as a Social Credit candidate in the electoral district of St. Albert. He defeated incumbent Omer St. Germain to pick up the seat for his party.

Holder ran for a second term in the 1940 general election. He was defeated by independent candidate Lionel Tellier on the fourth count.

Holder was nominated to run for Social Credit again at a convention held in Morinville on February 9, 1944. He ran in the general election held that year and won on the second vote count. He retired from the assembly at dissolution in 1948.

References

External links
Legislative Assembly of Alberta Members Listing

Alberta Social Credit Party MLAs
1874 births
1962 deaths